The Welsh Way was a British Iron Age trade route and track-way that originally carried trade between South Wales and the Oxford area of England across the Cotswold Hills. There is evidence it was utilised and improved  by the Roman army following the conquest of Britain as a link between Akeman Street and the Fosse Way.

It links the highest navigable point on the River Thames at Lechlade to the lowest crossing point of the River Severn at Gloucester. Originally it had a braided nature with one route through Quenington and another through Fairford.

From the thirteenth century to the eighteenth century it was the route taken by Welsh cattle drovers to London. At this time it took the name Tame's way after a rich family of Cotswolds merchants.

The  Welsh Way exists today as  a named lane which leaves the Gloucester-Cirencester road before Duntisbourne and passes through Barnsley and Ready Token to Fairford and Lechlade, eventually joining The Ridgeway near Wantage.

References

 Baddeley, St Clair, "On certain minor ancient roads to and from Corinium (Cirencester)",  Bristol and Gloucestershire Archaeological Society, Transactions, 47: pages 65–79,  1925
 Witts, G., Archaeological Handbook of the County of Gloucester, Cirencester: G. Norman, 1882
 Sawyer, J., "On Some Ancient Roads in The Cotswolds". Bristol and Gloucestershire Archaeological Society, Transactions, 20: pp. 247–254, 1897

External links 
 

Cotswolds
Ancient trackways in England
Geography of Gloucestershire
Geography of Oxfordshire
Archaeological sites in Oxfordshire